A character is a semiotic sign or symbol, or a glyph typically a letter, a numerical digit, an ideogram, a hieroglyph, a punctuation mark or another typographic mark.

History
The Ancient Greek word   ('charaktēr') is an agent noun of the verb  (charassō) with a meaning "to sharpen, to whet", and also "to make cake", from a PIE root  "cut" also continued in Irish gearr and English gash, which is perhaps an early loan ultimately from the same Greek root.

A  is thus an "engraver",  originally in the sense of a craftsman, but then also used for a tool used for engraving, and for a stamp for minting coins. From the stamp, the meaning was extended to the stamp impression, Plato using the noun in the sense of "engraved mark". In Plutarch, the word could refer to a figure or letter, Lucian uses it of hieroglyphs as opposed to Greek grammata (Herm. 44)

Metaphorically, it could refer to a distinctive mark, Herodotus (1.57) using it of a particular dialect, or (1.116) of a characteristic mark of an individual. The collective noun  "characteristics" appears later, in Dionysius Halicarnassensis.

Wycliffe (1382) has "To  a  [...] in her " for the mark of the beast (translating  "imprinted or branded mark").

Graphemes, glyphs and hieroglyphs

The word "character" was used in the sense of letter or grapheme by William Caxton, referring to the Phoenician alphabet:  (Eneydos 6.25). As in Greek, the word was used especially for foreign or mysterious graphemes (such as Chinese, Syriac, or Runic ones) as opposed to the familiar letters; in particular of shorthand (in David Copperfield (chapter 38) sarcastically of shorthand, "a procession of new horrors, called arbitrary characters; the most despotic characters I have ever known"), and since 1949 in computing (see character (computing)).

As a collective noun, the word can refer to writing or printing in general (Shakespeare's sonnet nr. 59: , meaning "since thought was first put into writing").

The word hieroglyph (Greek for sacred writing) dates from an early use in an English to Italian dictionary published by John Florio in 1598, referencing the  complex and mysterious characters of the Egyptian alphabet. Egyptian hieroglyphs were the formal writing system used in Ancient Egypt. Hieroglyphs combined logographic, syllabic and alphabetic elements, with a total of some 1,000 distinct characters.

Esotericism and magic

The word in Renaissance magic came to refer to any astrological, kabbalistic or magical sign or symbol. John Dee (1527 1608), a mathematician and occultist, designed an esoteric symbol (right),  which he described in his 1564 book, : the word hieroglyph is a composite of hiero (holy) and glyph (a distinct character).

In the  19th century, this sense of the word appears mainly in Romantic poetry, such as  Sir Walter Scott's Lay of the last minstrel (1805), where "A hallow'd taper shed a glimmering light / On mystic implements of magic might; On cross, and character, and talisman," (6.17).

Semiotics and epistemology

From the esoteric or mystical meanings, learned authors of the Early Modern period abstracted a notion of Character as a code or hierarchical system that embodied all knowledge or all of reality, or a written representation of a philosophical language that would recover the "true names" lost in the confusion of tongues. 

This idea had currency as a kind of epistemological philosophers' stone for about a century, from the mid 17th century, with Francis Lodwick (1642) and John Wilkins's  Essay towards a Real Character, and a Philosophical Language  (1668), to the later 18th century and the Encyclopédie where in a long entry under the heading Charactère, D'Alembert critically reviewed such projects of the past century.

See also
 Typeface anatomy, the graphic elements that make up letters in a typeface

References

Etymologies
Semiotics

pt:Caractere